Vokins is a surname. Notable people with the surname include:

 George Vokins (1896–1985), British modern pentathlete
 Jake Vokins (born 2000), English footballer
 Joan Vokins (?–1690), English Quaker preacher and traveller